Hasnabad or Husunabad is a small village in Kodangal mandal, Vikarabad district, Telangana, India.

References 

Villages in Vikarabad district